Esporte Clube XV de Novembro, commonly referred to as XV de Piracicaba, is a professional association football club based in Piracicaba, São Paulo, Brazil. The team competes in Campeonato Paulista Série A2, the second tier of the São Paulo state football league.

The club was founded in 1913 and its most famous President was Romeu Italo Ripoli.

History
During the 1910s, there were two important amateur football clubs in Piracicaba, Vergueirense, owned by Pousa family, and 12 de Outubro, owned by Guerrini family. In October 1913, the clubs' owners decided to merge both clubs. Captain Carlos Wingeter, of the Brazilian National Guard and who was also a dental surgeon, was appointed as the new club's first president. He accepted the task only if the club was named XV de Novembro (November 15), after the Brazilian Proclamation of Republic day.

On November 15, 1913, the club was founded as Esporte Clube XV de Novembro.

In 1943, XV de Piracicaba won its first title, which was the Campeonato Paulista Second Level, finishing one point ahead of Taubaté.

In 1964, Romeu Italo Ripoli took the XV on a tour through Europe and Asia. At that time, Brazil was already two-time world champion and only Santos and Botafogo made this type of trip. The team played in Sweden, Poland, Germany (Western and Eastern division of the season), Denmark and, at the height of Cold War , in the then Soviet Republics of Russia, Moldova, Ukraine, Kazakhstan and Uzbekistan.

In 1976, at the second term of Ripoli's presidency, the club finished second in the Campeonato Paulista Série A1, second only to Palmeiras.

In 1977, the club disputed the Campeonato Brasileiro First Division for the first time, finishing in the 22nd position, ahead of clubs like Internacional, Fluminense and Atlético Paranaense.

In 1979, XV de Piracicaba disputed the Campeonato Brasileiro First Division for the second time, finishing in the 13th position, ahead of clubs such as Fluminense and Botafogo.

In 1995, the club won its first national title, which was the Campeonato Brasileiro Série C, beating Volta Redonda of Rio de Janeiro state in the final.

In 2011, XV de Piracicaba was Série A2 champion after beating Guarani on penalty shoot outs after a draw score of 2–2 on the regular and extra time and gained again access to the São Paulo State First Division (Série A1) after 16 years.

In 2016, XV de Piracicaba was relegated from the São Paulo State First Division (Série A1) after 4 seasons in the top flight of the state competition. In the second semester of 2016, XV de Piracicaba won the Copa Paulista (one of top divisions of teams in who don't play in the top 4 leagues of the Brazilian Championship) for the first time in the club's history being awarded a spot in the Série D of the Brazilian Championship in 2017.

Achievements
Campeonato Brasileiro Série C: 1
1995
Campeonato Paulista:
 Runners-up (1): 1976
Copa Paulista: 2
2016, 2022
Campeonato Paulista Série A2: 6
1931, 1947, 1948, 1967, 1983, 2011
Copa Brasil Central: 1
1969

Current squad
As of January 2015

Stadium

XV de Piracicaba's home stadium is Estádio Barão de Serra Negra, inaugurated in 1965, with a maximum capacity of 26,528 people. In the 2nd Semester of 2007, the stadium has undergone a structural renovation in order to allow its safe use.

Mascot
XV de Piracicaba's mascot is Nhô Quim, created by Edson Rontani, and portraits the typical Piracicaban supporter.

See also
 Campeonato Paulista

References

External links
 XV de Piracicaba's official website

 
Association football clubs established in 1913
1913 establishments in Brazil
Football clubs in São Paulo (state)